Tu mourras moins bête... (You will die less stupid...) (German name: Wer nicht fragt, stirbt dumm! (He who doesn't ask dies stupid!)) is a French television show on Franco-German TV network Arte. The animation series is based on the blog Tu mourras moins bête by French comic artist Marion Montaigne.

Plot 
In the stories, the omniscient Professor Moustache (German name: Professor Schnauzbart) finds answers to curious questions from the world of science.

Synchronous voices 
The synchronous work for the German version is carried out by Christa Kistner Synchronproduktion, and the dialogue direction is made by Olaf Mierau.

Episode list

Reception
On the occasion of the broadcast of the first episode of Tu mourras moins bête, in 2015, the cultural magazine Télérama rewarded the series with two T's,which in its rating system means We like a lot. The critic highlights in particular the author's sense of humor: "Marion Montaigne masters in any case perfectly the mechanisms of laughter: she is able to tease our armpits with the Higgs boson, the operation of a nuclear power plant or ophthalmology in animals.

In October, during the broadcast of the second season of the series, the Arte channel made known its satisfaction by noting nearly thirteen million views of episodes in total, and a strong acceleration of the audience of the Youtube channel Tu mourirras moins bête,whose number of subscribers has experienced "a very strong increase, from 33,000 to 177,000 subscribers, an increase of more than 500% in just over a month,"adding that "Every new video is in the top 10 of YouTube Uk Trends.

Literature 

 Marion Montaigne: La science, c'est pas du cinéma! Ankama, Paris 2011, 
 Marion Montaigne: Quoi de neuf, docteur Moustache? Ankama, Paris 2012, 
 Marion Montaigne: Science un jour, Science toujours! Delcourt, Paris 2014, 
 Marion Montaigne: Professeur Moustache étale sa science! Delcourt, Paris 2015,

External links 
Tu mourras moins bête... on IMDb

References 

2016 French television series debuts
2010s French animated television series
French-language television shows
French children's animated education television series
Science education television series
Television series based on French comics